Eddy Hellebuyck (born 22 January 1961) is a Belgian-born American long-distance runner. He competed in the men's marathon at the 1996 Summer Olympics, representing Belgium and finishing in 67th place.  By 2000, he had become a U.S. citizen and competed in the U.S. Olympic Trials that year, but did not make the team.

In 2004, he tested positive for recombinant human Erythropoietin (rhEPO) and was suspended from competition for two years.

See also
List of doping cases in athletics

References

1961 births
Living people
Place of birth missing (living people)
Belgian male long-distance runners
Belgian male marathon runners
American male long-distance runners
American male marathon runners
Olympic male marathon runners
Olympic athletes of Belgium
Athletes (track and field) at the 1996 Summer Olympics
Japan Championships in Athletics winners
Belgian emigrants to the United States
Doping cases in athletics
Belgian sportspeople in doping cases
American sportspeople in doping cases